Carrathool  is a village in the western Riverina region of New South Wales, Australia, in Carrathool Shire. In , Carrathool had a population of 296 people. The village is situated on the plain a few kilometres north of the river, clustered around the now-disused railway station.

The place name Carrathool is derived from the local Aboriginal word meaning "Native Companion".

History

Carrathool Reserve

The location of the original village of Carrathool – or 'Currathool' as it was often written – was at a river-crossing on the Murrumbidgee River at a place called Boree Point.

Carrathool Post Office opened on 20 June 1882.
Carrathool notably is sign posted on its outskirts "population 99" and for many years hoped to reach 100, however with droughts and children often moving to larger centres this figure may never have been reached. The above census figures for 2006 would not relate to the township of Carrathool and would not have a higher population than its neighbouring township of Goolgowi.

Heritage listings
Carrathool has a number of heritage-listed sites, including:
 244 Main Road: Carrathool Bridge over Murrumbidgee River

References

External links

Hay Historical Society homepage
Trove Digitised Newspaper Search

 
Towns in New South Wales
Populated places on the Murrumbidgee River
Sturt County